SuperDévoluy (Superdévoluy - La Joue du Loup) is a ski resort in the commune of Dévoluy in the French Alps. It is located in the « Alpes du Sud » , French department in the Provence Alpes Cotes d’Azur (PACA) region. With the other ski resort La Joue du Loup, there are 100 km of ski pistes, with 5 black pistes.

The ski resort was built in 1966 in the frame of the French “snow plan” decided in 1964. There is a big activity of pastoralism in the Devoluy. In the village of Saint-Étienne-en-Dévoluy, there are 7 family sheep farms with more than 300 sheep each to discover in the winter.

 At the top of the plateau de Bure, accessible by foot from the top of the ski track Pierra of Superdevoluy, there is the NOEMA which is currently the most advanced millimeter array in the Northern Hemisphere. This observatory is operated and maintained by the Institute for Radio Astronomy in Millimetric range (IRAM)
 From a three antenna interferometer with a maximum baseline of 288 meters in 1988, it has evolved to an 12-antenna array with baselines up to 760 meters. 

NOEMA (NOrthern Extended Millimeter Array)

References

External links

Ski areas and resorts in France
Provence-Alpes-Côte d'Azur region articles needing translation from French Wikipedia